The Central Canada Hockey League (CCHL) is a Canadian Junior "A" ice hockey league operating in eastern Ontario, Canada.  The league is sanctioned by Hockey Eastern Ontario and Hockey Canada and is a member of the Canadian Junior Hockey League.  The winner of the CCHL playoffs competes for the Fred Page Cup — the Eastern Region championship of the Canadian Junior Hockey League — with the winners of the Quebec Junior AAA Hockey League and the Maritime Junior A Hockey League.  The winner of the Fred Page Cup then moves on to compete for the national Centennial Cup.

History
The league started in 1961 as the Ottawa-Hull District Junior Hockey League, under the sponsorship of the Montreal Canadiens of the National Hockey League (NHL), in hope of a better development program. The league has featured such NHL stars as Steve Yzerman and Larry Robinson, for which its two divisions are named.  As this league was for the Ottawa District, teams out of the area were not allowed to compete, with one exemption: Pembroke. In the early years, any player in the league was automatically a member of the Montreal Canadiens, and were forced into a contract which would disallow them to sign with any other NHL team if they wanted to play in the NHL. The Canadiens also wanted the league to be strictly for development, allowing four 19-year-olds and five 18-year-olds per team with the rest of the players being 17 or younger. This was met with much anger and disappointment with players who had just reached their 20s, but the league substantially gained in popularity and did not step back from the changes. In 1963, the Montreal Canadiens allowed the Chicago Blackhawks-sponsored Brockville Braves into the league. The league rebranded itself as the Central Junior A Hockey League (CJHL) starting with the 1964–65 season.

In February 1966, players from the Hawkesbury Braves went on strike over coaching issues. The Braves brought in replacement players from midget and Jr. B leagues for a game against the CJHL's perennial champions, the Cornwall Royals. The Royals went on to win 43–0, which still stands as the highest margin of victory in the league. As CJHL champions, the Royals represented the league at the playdowns for the 1966, 1967 and 1968 Memorial Cup national junior hockey championships. They applied to enter into the stronger Ontario Hockey Association (today's OHL) but were turned away; they next applied to join the new Quebec Major Junior Hockey League (QMJHL) and were accepted as one of the inaugural teams for the 1969–70 season. In 1973, the Hull Festivals, also departed for the QMJHL. In 1975, the Canadian Hockey Association informed the league that they had to allow 20-year-olds into their league, matching what all other leagues of their calibre were doing.

In 1976, Bryan Murray took over as head coach of the Rockland Nationals.  With Murray at the wheel, the Nationals won the league, the region, and then went on to win the Junior A National Championship Centennial Cup. The financial cost of the playoff run was too much for the team's backers to handle and they declared bankruptcy one disappointing season after winning it all. The Nationals have resurrected since then as a member of the Eastern Ontario Junior C Hockey League.

After the ruling that allowed 20-year-olds to play in the league, teams began attempting to "buy" championship teams by going after former Major Junior players. The effect of this resulted in the labeling of the league as a "goon league" or "bush league" as the league got more violent.  The fan base dwindled, and by 1984 there were only 5 teams left in the league, all on the verge of bankruptcy. The owners of the five teams approached the owners of Ottawa's Talisman Hotel and asked them to purchase the league. Through new management and rule changes, the league barred 20-year-olds from the Major Junior ranks, created a limit of five 20-year-olds (homegrown from the CJHL), and banned the paying of players. The new rules worked, and the league was once again successful. The league then approached the Canadian Hockey Association, and requested a new system. After the fall of the Rockland Nationals, the league realized there was a revenue problem amongst its teams.  The league demanded longer regular seasons and a shorter National playdown schedule to determine the National Champion. This new system was guaranteed to increase revenue amongst all teams nationwide as they were allowed to have more home games, increasing revenue through ticket sales, and decreased the travel expenditures that forced the Rockland Nationals to fold soon after they won the National Championship.

The league began flourishing, and by the early 1990s, had more than doubled. Teams that had folded during the "dark days" of the late 1970s and early 1980s came back. The league even allowed for the expansion of their first American hockey team, the Massena Americans. Also, now a member of the OHL, the Cornwall Royals moved from Cornwall. In response, the CJHL allowed the Messena Americans to move to Cornwall, hoping the Cornwall Colts could help the city fill its competitive hockey "void".

The Gloucester Rangers hosted the last Centennial Cup tournament in 1995 before it was transformed into the Royal Bank Cup. The Rangers boosted NHL stars like Mathieu Dandenault and Robert Esche. The Gloucester Rangers were seconds away from defeating the Calgary Canucks in the final, until the Canucks scored a last-minute goal and won it all in overtime, to continue the drought of a CJHL team winning the National Junior "A" Championship.

In 2004–05, the Central Junior Hockey League saw higher attendance figures in all arenas with the NHL lockout. All teams in the CJHL had doubled their attendance.

In April 2007, it was announced that the Kemptville 73's were joining the CJHL as its 11th member team.  The 73's formerly played in the Eastern Ontario Junior B Hockey League.

The Cornwall Colts became the 4th team in CJHL history to play host to a Centennial/Royal Bank Cup tournament in 2008. The Colts managed to qualify for the semi-finals, but were ousted 7–1 by the Humboldt Broncos.

In 2009, the Carleton Place Canadians, another former EOJBHL team, was announced as the league's 12th franchise. They began play during the 2009–10 season. At the beginning of the 2009–10 season, the league dropped the "A" from their name, switching to the Central Junior Hockey League.

In February 2010, it was announced that the Smiths Falls Memorial Centre – one of the league's oldest facilities and home to the Smiths Falls Bears was staging its final home game of the 2009–10 season. The Bears will be moving into a brand-new multipurpose facility for that fall.  The Memorial Centre was demolished to accommodate parking spaces for the new facility.

In April 2010, the Pembroke Lumber Kings made CJHL history by winning four-consecutive Art Bogart Cup championships, which is now the most-consecutive championships won by a CJHL team, however the Pembroke Lumber Kings qualified for the Fred Page Cup for the fifth consecutive year, but lost the finals to the Brockville Braves, who advanced to the Royal Bank Cup in Dauphin, Manitoba. The 2012 Fred Page Cup was awarded to the Kanata Stallions to commemorate their 25 years of Jr. A hockey in Kanata.

On April 26, 2010, the league rebranded by changing their league to the Central Hockey League, from the Central Junior Hockey League. A league, by the same name "Central Hockey League" already existed, a minor professional league below the ECHL, which was 15 teams throughout the mid-western United States. In January 2011, the league rebranded itself again the Central Canada Hockey League.

On May 8, 2011, at the 2011 Royal Bank Cup in Camrose, Alberta, the Pembroke Lumber Kings defeated the BCHL's Vernon Vipers 2–0 to win the CCHL's second ever National Title during the league's 50th anniversary season.

Prior to the 2014–15 season, the CCHL announced it was adapting the American Hockey League's overtime format.

Following tied games, teams will remain at the 3rd period ends and 7:00 minutes will be placed on the clock after a 30-second break.  Each team will receive 1 point.
The first 3 minutes of over time will be played 4 on 4. At the first whistle after 3 minutes (i.e. if the clock reads 4:00 or less) the teams will play 3 on 3.  The same penalty regulations apply. The games are again sudden victory with the first team to score collects an additional point.
In the event the game remains tied after the conclusion of seven minutes of overtime, a 30-second break during which the team coaches will provide a list of 3 shooters will precede a shoot out.  Home teams shall determine if they shoot first or second. If the score after 3 rounds of shooters remains tied, there will be a continued sudden death single round shoot out until a winner is declared.
No shooter may shoot twice until all eligible shooters have shot once.
Players in the penalty box at the conclusion of overtime shall not be eligible to participate in the shoot out.

In the 2013–14 season, 69 CCHL regular season games were tied after regulation. The outcome of 30 games was determined in the over time session and 39 games required a shoot out.

For the 2015–16 the CCHL made a significant move to the development model for the league. The Eastern Ontario Junior B Hockey League was aligned directly with the CCHL to establish direct affiliations and specific guidelines for players to move up and down between leagues. The EOJBHL also took on a re-branding to become the Central Canada Hockey League Tier 2. The development model is also to be extended to affiliation with midget (under18) teams.

In fall 2016, the Gloucester Rangers were sold to new ownership, who will relocate the team to Rockland, Ontario for the 2017–18 season and become the Rockland Nationals. The current Rockland Nationals, who currently play in the National Capital Junior Hockey League are expected to relocate to a nearby community to accommodate junior A hockey in the community for the first time since 1977. The Rockland Nationals expect to develop and renew their geographical rivalry with the Hawkesbury Hawks, and also develop a rivalry with the Cumberland Grads.

David Frost incident
David Frost, the agent of former St. Louis Blues player Mike Danton, was banned from all Central Junior "A" Hockey League games and events in fall 2005 after Frost entered an off-limits-to-fans area at the Jim Durrell Arena, home to the Ottawa Jr. Senators, in which Frost "accosted, harassed and threatened an official of the CJHL". League commissioner Mac MacLean stated "We don't want him around period". The Lumber Kings were fined $1000 for David Frost's actions, because the league considered Frost to be associated with owner Sheldon Keefe. MacLean sent posters to each league arena to help security staff identify Frost if he were to show up at games, and to refuse entry to Frost. Weeks later, the ban was lifted after Mac MacLean was relieved of his duties of CJHL commissioner. Newly appointed commissioner John Comerford lifted the ban, stating "We can't stop David Frost from entering the rink and I haven't received any complaints from anybody about him". League's former vice president, who was fired tried to extend the ban throughout the 2005–06 season. David Frost had no affiliation with the Pembroke Lumber Kings hockey organization. He was allowed to attend league games, but was barred from restricted areas. Frost disregarded the advisement not to enter restricted areas, and was seen getting off the Lumber Kings team bus by CBC Fifth Estate film crew, and was filmed following the team to dressing room during a playoff game in Nepean. At the end of the season, David Frost severed un-affiliated ties with the league and informed that he would not attend any more league games or events.

Teams

Regular season champions
{| cellpadding="0" 
|- style="text-align: left; vertical-align: top" 
| 
|

Art Bogart Cup champions
''Note: league champions are bolded

Regional championships

Centennial Cup/Royal Bank Cup championships

Former member teams
Arnprior Packers – left to join Ottawa Valley Junior Hockey League after the 1966–67 season
Arnprior Legion
Arnprior Rams 
Brockville Ramblers
Buckingham Beavers
Cornwall Royals – left to join the new Quebec Major Junior Hockey League after the 1968–69 season
Eastview Astros – folded after 1968–69 season
Eastview Primrose
Gatineau Actionaires
Hawkesbury Royals 
Gloucester Rangers - Franchise known as Orleans Blues from 2005 to 2008, and Gloucester Rangers from 1973 to 2005 and 2008-2017
Hull Castors
Hull Éperviers
Hull-Volant 
Hull Festivals – left to join Quebec Major Junior Hockey League after 1972–73 season
Ottawa Capitals
Ottawa Metros
Ottawa Montagnards
Pembroke C and A's
Pembroke Ironmen
Pembroke Royals – played during the 1979–80 season, while the Pembroke Lumber Kings were suspended
Rockland Nationals – folded after 1976–77 season
Thurso Lions

Notable alumni
Notable players who have played or are playing in the NHL:

League records
Best record: 2013-14 Carleton Place Canadians (54–6–0-2)
Worst record: 1987–88 Smiths Falls Bears (4–52–0)
Most Wins in a Season: 2013–14 Carleton Place Canadians (54)
Most Points in a Season: Carleton Place Canadians (110) - 2013-14 & 2017-18
Most Consecutive Wins: 2009–10 Brockville Braves (26)
Largest margin of victory: Cornwall Royals 43 – Hawkesbury Braves 0 in February 1966
Most goals, one season: Luc Chabot (101) – 1985–86 Pembroke Lumber Kings
Most assists, one season: Peter White (136) – 1987–88 Pembroke Lumber Kings
Most points, one season: Peter White (226) – 1987–88 Pembroke Lumber Kings
Most penalty minutes, one season: Frank Manson (416) – 1992–93 Ottawa Senators
Most goals, career: Luc Chabot (255) – Pembroke Lumber Kings
Most assists, career: George Dupont (332) – Nepean Raiders/Pembroke Lumber Kings
Most points, career: Luc Chabot (490) – Pembroke Lumber Kings
Most penalty minutes, career: Travis Albers (942) – Nepean/Cornwall/Kanata/Brockville
Most minutes played, one season: Francis Marotte (3220.16) – 2015-16 Nepean Raiders
Most wins, one season: Pete Karvouniaris (40) – 2010-11 Cornwall Colts
Lowest goals against average, one season: Devon Levi (1.47) – 2019-20 Carleton Place Canadians
Highest percentage, one season: Devon Levi (0.941) – 2019-20 Carleton Place Canadians
Most shutouts, one season: Henry Johnson (9) – 2015-16 Brockville Braves
Most minutes played, career: Mark Byrne (11,143) – Nepean Raiders
Most wins, career: Grant Robb (87) – Pembroke Lumber Kings

Timeline of teams in the CJHL
1963 – Brockville Braves join league and are sponsored by the Chicago Blackhawks
1968 – Eastview Astros join league and fold after one season
1972 – Hull Hawks and Cornwall Royals leave league to join Quebec Major Junior Hockey League
1972 – Nepean Raiders join league
1973 – Ottawa M.&W. Rangers become Gloucester Rangers
1974 – Hawkesbury Hawks join league
1976 – Smiths Falls Bears leave league
1977 – Rockland Nationals leave league
1979 – Pembroke Lumber Kings are expelled from the league for failing to remain in good standing.
1979 – Pembroke Royals play their first and only season in 1979–80
1980 – Pembroke Lumber Kings reapply for a franchise and are accepted into the league.
1987 – Kanata Valley Lasers join league
1987 – Smiths Falls Bears rejoin league
1988 – Massena Turbines join league
1990 – Massena Turbines become Massena Americans
1991 – Cumberland Grads join league from Eastern Ontario Junior B Hockey League
1992 – Massena Americans relocated to Cornwall to become the Cornwall Colts to fill in the void for the Cornwall Royals, who moved to Newmarket
1992 – Ottawa Senators become Ottawa Jr. Senators because of the NHL expansion team Ottawa Senators
2000 – Smiths Falls Bears relocate to Perth, Ontario and become the Lanark Thunder
2002 – Kanata Valley Lasers become Kanata Stallions
2002 – Lanark Thunder suspends operations and team is returned to Smiths Falls as the Smiths Falls Bears
2005 – Gloucester Rangers become the Orleans Blues
2007 – Kemptville 73's join league from Eastern Ontario Junior B Hockey League
2008 – Orleans Blues become Gloucester Rangers after league refuses permit to move team to Orleans
2009 – Carleton Place Jr. A Canadians join league from Eastern Ontario Junior B Hockey League
2014 – Kanata Stallions become Kanata Lasers mid-season
2017 - Gloucester Rangers relocate to Rockland and become Rockland Nationals

References

External links
Central Junior Hockey League website

 
Ice hockey leagues in Ontario
A
Canadian Junior Hockey League members
Hockey Eastern Ontario